Karobaar is a 2000 Indian Hindi romantic thriller film directed by Rakesh Roshan. The film stars Rishi Kapoor (in a dual role), Anil Kapoor and Juhi Chawla in leading roles. Inspired by Indecent Proposal, the film began production in 1992 and was plagued by production problems and was finally released in 2000.

Plot
Wealthy Rajiv Sinha and middle class Amar Saxena are childhood friends with similar likes. Coincidentally they fall in love with the same girl Seema. Rajiv somehow persuades Amar to marry a girl being brought up badly, Amar is adamant and he marries Sapna. But soon he learns it was Rajiv's way of separating him and Seema. They become bitter enemies. Soon Rajiv is charged with killing a girl. Amar, who is now a lawyer, decides to retaliate against Rajiv.

Cast

 Rishi Kapoor as Advocate Amar Saxena / Rohit Sinha (Double Role)
 Anil Kapoor as Rajiv Sinha
 Juhi Chawla as Seema
 Tisca Chopra as Neelam
 Navin Nischol as Rajesh Puri
 Tinu Anand as Ramlal
 Asrani as Champak
 Dinesh Hingoo as Bhojwani estate agent

Production
Rishi Kapoor completed his scenes for the film in May, 1998.

Soundtrack
The music is composed by Rajesh Roshan, while all the songs are written by Javed Akhtar.

Reception
Indu Mirani wrote for Sify that the film had "nothing even remotely attractive about it". In his review for The Tribune, Sanjeev Bariana wrote that the film's "storyline seems unconvincing and rather dragged". Joginder Tuteja described the film as a "mega disaster". It performed poorly at the box-office.

References

External links
Karobaar Details

2000 films
2000s Hindi-language films
Indian romantic thriller films
Films directed by Rakesh Roshan
Films scored by Rajesh Roshan
Films scored by Surinder Sodhi
2000s romantic thriller films